Brereton is a surname. Notable people with the surname include:

Alexander Picton Brereton (1892–1976), Canadian recipient of the Victoria Cross
Ben Brereton, (born 1999), English footballer
Cuthbert A. Brereton (1850–1910), British civil engineer
Dan Brereton (born 1965), American artist and illustrator
Dermott Brereton (born 1964), Australian rules footballer
Ernest Le Gay Brereton (1869–1932), Australian mining engineer and academic
Frederick Sadleir Brereton (1852–1957), British author
Henry E. H. Brereton (1865–1957), New York politician
Jack Brereton (born 1991), British politician
John Brereton (disambiguation), several people
 John Brereton, 4th Baron Brereton (1659–1718), English baron in the peerage of Ireland
 John Le Gay Brereton (1871–1933), Australian poet
 John Brereton (footballer) (1935–2021), Australian footballer
 John Brereton (Irish lawyer) (1576–1629), English-born lawyer
Joseph Lloyd Brereton (1822–1901), English educational reformer and writer
Kevin Brereton (born 1972), Canadian singer, songwriter and record producer
Laurie Brereton (born 1946), Australian politician
Lewis H. Brereton (1890–1967), American military aviation pioneer
Mocky Brereton, New Zealand rugby league footballer
Patrick Brereton, author and academic at Dublin City University
Paul Brereton (born 1957), Australian judge and soldier
Robert Maitland Brereton (1834–1911), English railway engineer
Robert Pearson Brereton (1818–1894), British engineer and colleague of Isambard Kingdom Brunel 
Thomas Brereton (1782–1831), Irish soldier, governor of Senegal
William Brereton (disambiguation), several people
 William Brereton (fl. 1406–1432), MP for Midhurst and Chichester
 William Brereton (courtier) (d. 1536) in the privy chamber of Henry VIII
 Sir William Brereton (died 1559) (c. 1520–1559), MP for Cheshire
 Sir William Brereton, 1st Baronet (1604–1661), Parliamentary General in the English Civil War
 William Brereton, 1st, 2nd and 3rd Lords Brereton
 William Brereton, 1st Baron Brereton (1550–1630), MP for Cheshire in 1597, 1614 and 1621
 William Brereton, 2nd Baron Brereton (1611–1664), MP for Cheshire in 1661
 William Brereton, 3rd Baron Brereton (1631–1680), MP for Newton in 1659 and Bossiney 1660
 William Brereton (British Army officer) (1789–1864), colonel in the Royal Horse Artillery
 William Brereton (Norfolk cricketer) (1786–1851), English cricketer
 William Brereton (priest) (1726–1812), Archdeacon of Lichfield, 1782–1801
 William Brereton (planter) (died 1822), planter in British Guiana